This is a list of Estonian television related events from 2004.

Events
7 February - Neiokõsõ are selected to represent Estonia at the 2004 Eurovision Song Contest with their song "Tii". They are selected to be the tenth Estonian Eurovision entry during Eurolaul held at the ETV Studios in Tallinn.

Debuts

Television shows

1990s
Õnne 13 (1993–present)

Ending this year

Births

Deaths
17 September - Evi Rauer, actress & TV director (born 1915)